The second season of M*A*S*H aired Saturdays at 8:30–9:00 pm on CBS.

Cast
The following six actors appeared in the opening credits:

Recurring roles:

† First season as a recurring player
‡ Last season as a recurring player

Episodes

Notes

References

External links 
 List of M*A*S*H (season 2) episodes at the Internet Movie Database

1973 American television seasons
1974 American television seasons
MASH 02